Heimdal Station is a railway station located in Heimdal in Trondheim, Norway. Located 12 km south of Trondheim Central Station on the Dovre Line, it is served by express trains between Trondheim and Oslo Central Station as well as the regional train services Trøndelag Commuter Rail and Nabotåget, all operated by SJ Norge. The station is staffed.

History
The station was opened on 5 August 1864 as part of Trondhjem–Støren Line, and has been reclassified as part of the Røros Line from 1877 and the Dovre Line in 1921. The station had cargo handling facilities, water tower and a pig barn. A new station building was planned from the 1940s, but the current building was not finished until 1960.

References

External links
Entry at Norsk Jernbaneklubb

Railway stations in Trondheim
Railway stations on the Dovre Line
Railway stations opened in 1864
1864 establishments in Norway